Jennifer Mundel (born 20 January 1962) is a former professional tennis player from South Africa. She reached the quarterfinals of the singles event at the 1983 Wimbledon championships after victories against seeded players Sylvia Hanika and Hana Mandlíková. Her only professional singles title came at the 1983 Bakersfield Open which was part of the Ginny Circuit. She was a doubles finalist at the 1982 Hong Kong Open, the 1984 Central Fidelity Banks International, and the 1985 Virginia Slims of Indianapolis.

Career finals

Singles (1 win)

References

External links
 
 

South African female tennis players
Living people
1962 births
People from Rustenburg
White South African people